Ingeborg Walberg (née von Düben 6 December 1862 – 17 March 1943) was a Swedish baroness and missionary.

Life 
Ingeborg Walberg was born in 1862 in Överselö parish. Her parents were Cesar von Düben and Augusta Lilliestråle. She was granddaughter of Anders Gustaf von Düben. Walberg was elected by Svenska kyrkans mission in January 1890, serving the Church of Sweden, after she had left her role as private tutor for the children of the Witts family. She arrived in Ekutuleni in October 1892 to work at the Missionary Center in Ekutuleni, Natal, and to assist missionary Fristedt, in his work with education and the orphanage's activities.

In addition to her work as a missionary, she also collected several ethnographical objects. Which she later donated to the Swedish Museum of Natural History.

She married Erik Gustaf Walberg in 1897, a priest and missionary at the missionary center in Ekutuleni.

References 

1862 births
1943 deaths
Female Christian missionaries
Swedish Christian missionaries
Swedish people of German descent
19th-century Swedish nobility
19th-century Swedish people
Swedish women educators
Swedish ethnographers
Ingeborg